Chitra Sinha is a Bangladeshi film actress, dancer and also producer. In 1960, she made her acting debut with the film Rajdhanir Buke, directed by Ehtesham. In that film, she became popularity with co-actor Rahman. In her short acting career, she played only nine films. After marrying film director Kazi Zaheer, she assumed the name Chitra Sinha to Chitra Zahir. He is currently the proprietor of Chitra Films Production Company. Since the sixties, several notable films were produced through this organization.

Early life
Chitra Sinha was born in Rajshahi.

Filmography

As an actor

As a producer

Personal life
In the late 1960s, Chitra Sinha was married to film director Kazi Zahir. After marriage, she got acquainted with the name Chitra Zaheer. Their only child Sagar Zaheer is currently associated with film productions.

References

External links
 

Bangladeshi film actresses
Bengali actresses
Actresses in Bengali cinema
20th-century Indian actresses